National Book Centre is a Bangladesh government centre under the Ministry of Cultural Affairs that is responsible for encouraging reading, organize book fairs, and support publishing of books in Bangladesh.

History
In 1960, the National Book Centre of Pakistan was established by the education department of the Federal Government of Pakistan with assistance from the UNESCO, having a branch in Dhaka. After Bangladesh's independence in 1971, it was renamed as "National Book Cenre Bangladesh". In 1983, the organization became autonomous following the recommendation of the Anam committee's report. In 1995, the "National Book Centre" law was passed in the parliament of Bangladesh and the organization was subsequently renamed as "National Book Centre". In 2016, the Government of Bangladesh announced plans to shift the National Book Centre and the Central Public Library to a newly constructed high-rise building. The centre awards annually the National Book Centre Award for notable publications in Bangladesh.

References

1960 establishments in East Pakistan
Organisations based in Dhaka
Government agencies of Bangladesh